Hamidabad (also Romanized as Ḩamīdābād) is a village in Eqbal-e Sharqi Rural District, in the Central District of Qazvin County, Qazvin Province, Iran. At the 2006 census, its population was 799, in 212 families. This village is populated by Azerbaijani Turks.

References 

Populated places in Qazvin County